
Year 55 BC was a year of the pre-Julian Roman calendar. At the time, it was known as the Year of the Consulship of Crassus and Pompey (or, less frequently, year 699 Ab urbe condita). The denomination 55 BC for this year has been used since the early medieval period, when the Anno Domini calendar era became the prevalent method in Europe for naming years.

Events 
 By place 

 Roman Republic 
 Consuls: Marcus Licinius Crassus and Gnaeus Pompeius Magnus.
 Consuls Marcus Licinius Crassus and Gnaeus Pompeius Magnus pass the Lex Trebonia.
 Pompey's Theater, the first permanent (non-wooden) theatre in Rome is built. Built of stone on the Field of Mars, it included a temple to Venus Victorious, a public courtyard, and a meeting hall or curia in the far end near the "Sacred Area".
 Fourth year of Julius Caesar's Gallic Wars:
 Spring – Julius Caesar starts the season campaigning in Illyricum (in the Balkan region) against the Pirustae, who have been raiding Roman territory.
 Summer – Julius Caesar defeats the Usipetes and the Tencteri, two Germanic tribes who have been driven across the Rhine River by the Suebi. He spreads Roman law and order, and makes the whole country as far as the Channel accessible to trade.
 May – Julius Caesar defeats a Germanic army then massacres the women and children, totalling 430,000 people, near the Meuse and Rhine Rivers (now known as the city of Kessel in the Netherlands).
 June – Julius Caesar crosses the Rhine River near modern-day Koblenz. He constructs a wooden bridge between Andernach and Neuwied (Germany).

 Britain 
 August 22 or August 26 – Julius Caesar commands his first invasions of Britain, likely a reconnaissance-in-force expedition, in response to the Britons giving military aid to his Gallic enemies. Caesar retreats back to Gaul when the majority of his force is prevented from landing by storms.

 Parthia 
 Mithridates IV, claimant to the throne of Parthia, supported by Aulus Gabinius, Roman governor of Syria, is defeated by Surena, general under Orodes, in the Battle of Seleucia.

Births 
 Tibullus, Roman Latin poet (approximate date)

Deaths 
 Archelaus, high priest of Comana (Cappadocia)
 Berenice IV Epiphaneia, queen of Egypt (b. 77 BC)
 Lucretius, Roman philosopher (b. c. 99 BC)
 Quintus Caecilius Metellus Nepos, Roman consul
 Quintus Caecilius Metellus Nepos Iunior, Roman consul
 Tigranes the Great, Armenian Emperor (b. c. 140 BC)

References